The Waitangi Tribunal (Māori: Te Rōpū Whakamana i te Tiriti o Waitangi) is a New Zealand permanent commission of inquiry established under the Treaty of Waitangi Act 1975. It is charged with investigating and making recommendations on claims brought by Māori relating to actions or omissions of the Crown, in the period largely since 1840, that breach the promises made in the Treaty of Waitangi. The Tribunal is not a court of law; therefore, the Tribunal's recommendations and findings are not binding on the Crown. They are sometimes not acted on, for instance in the foreshore and seabed dispute.

The inquiry process contributes to the resolution of Treaty claims and to the reconciliation of outstanding issues between Māori and Pākehā. In 2014, the Tribunal found that Ngāpuhi rangatira did not give up their sovereignty when they signed the Treaty of Waitangi in 1840.

History
In 1975, protests from indigenous peoples about unresolved Treaty of Waitangi grievances had been increasing for some time, and the Tribunal was set up to provide a legal process for the investigation of those grievances. The Honourable Matiu Rata was Minister of Māori Affairs in the early 1970s and the politician most responsible for the Tribunal's creation.

Originally the Tribunal could investigate grievances only since 1975, but in 1985, a law change meant the Tribunal's jurisdiction was extended back to 1840, the date of the Waitangi Treaty. The subsequent findings of many Treaty breaches by the Crown in various inquiries led to a public backlash against the Tribunal. The Tribunal has often been a political issue in the 1990s and 2000s.

Originally a Tribunal investigation and report was a prerequisite for a Treaty settlement with the New Zealand Government. But in 1999, to speed up settlements, the government changed the process so that claimants could go straight to settlement with the Office of Treaty Settlements without engaging in the Tribunal process. This was an increasingly popular short-cut to settlement in the face of the slow Tribunal process. The deadline for submitting historical claims was 1 September 2008, but contemporary claims can still be filed.

Notable tribunal inquiries

Taonga and the Wai 26 and 150 claim regarding radio frequencies
In June 1986, the Waitangi Tribunal received the Wai 26 claim that the Treaty of Waitangi was breached by the Crown who failed to await recommendations within the Tribunal's te reo Māori (1986) report before introducing a bill on the Māori language. This raised dispute as Māori were concerned that the bill might preempt and therefore not fully take into account the recommendations of the Waitangi Tribunal report. The second part of the claim identified that Te reo Māori held taonga status and the (then) Broadcasting Corporation of New Zealand "had not provided adequately for Māori radio listeners and television viewers." when the Crown had an obligation to uphold and promote te reo Māori through electronic mediums.

In June 1990, claim Wai 150 was lodged by Sir Graham Latimer on behalf of the New Zealand Māori Council. The claim was in respect of the Rangatiratanga over the allocation of radio frequencies; the claim being that in the absence of an agreement with the Māori, the sale of frequency management licences under the Radiocommunications Act 1989 would be in breach of the Treaty of Waitangi; denying Māori rights to the radio spectrum would therefore deny an instrumental means of providing te reo Māori to New Zealand. The Waitangi Tribunal amalgamated the Wai 26 with the Wai 150 claim. The final report of the Tribunal recommended that the Crown suspend the radio frequency tender process and proceed to negotiate with the Iwi.

Ngāi Tahu claim
The Ngāi Tahu Maori Trust Board filed the claim with the Waitangi Tribunal in 1986. The claim covered nine different areas and was heard over two years from 1987. The Tribunal released its three-volume report in 1991 – at that time it was the tribunal's most comprehensive inquiry. It found that "the Crown acted unconscionably and in repeated breach of the Treaty of Waitangi" in its land dealings with the tribe, and recommended substantial compensation. Ngāi Tahu also filed a claim in regards to commercial fisheries, in regards to which the Tribunal released its report in 1993. Ngāi Tahu settled with the Crown in 1998, and received $170 million in compensation, an apology, and the return of its sacred mountain Aoraki/Mount Cook (the tribe later gifted this back to the Nation).

The Wai 262 claim in respect of mātauranga Māori
On 2 July 2011, the Tribunal released its long-awaited report into the Wai 262 claim: "Ko Aotearoa Tēnei" (‘This is Aotearoa’ or ‘This is New Zealand’). The Wai 262 claim concerns the ownership of, and rights to, mātauranga Māori (Māori knowledge) in respect of indigenous flora and fauna. The Wai 262 claim, and the subsequent Ko Aotearoa Tēnei report, is unusual in Tribunal terms because of its wide scope and the contemporary nature of the issues being grappled with. It was the Tribunal's first 'whole-of-government' inquiry, and considers more than 20 government departments and agencies, and makes recommendations as to reforms of "laws, policies or practices relating to health, education, science, intellectual property, indigenous flora and fauna, resource management, conservation, the Māori language, arts and culture, heritage, and the involvement of Māori in the development of New Zealand's positions on international instruments affecting indigenous rights."

In the cover letter of the report, the Tribunal argues that:

Water and geothermal rights inquiry

The New Zealand Māori Council brought the claim before the Tribunal in early 2012, arguing that the sale of 49 per cent of Mighty River Power (now Mercury Energy), Meridian Energy, and Genesis Energy would prejudice any possible future recognition of Māori rights in water and geothermal resources. On 1 August 2012, the Tribunal released a memorandum finding that the government should temporarily halt its asset sales programme until it had released its interim full report. The pre-publications report was subsequently released on 24 August, and suggested that the government should postpone the asset sales programme until the issue had been resolved with Māori around the country. This finding was reached on the basis that, if the government were to proceed with the partial-privatisation programme, it would reduce its ability to resolve outstanding claims to water and geothermal rights. In terms of potential avenues for resolution, the Tribunal recommended a national hui be called so that all parties to the dispute could voice their positions.

In response to the findings of The Tribunal, the National Government postponed the float of Mighty River Power until early 2013, but rejected calls for a national hui and the "shares plus" idea. Nevertheless, a hui was called for September 2012, but no representatives from the Government or the National Party attended.  The issue was taken to court, with the courts ultimately ruling that the partial privatisation programme would not affect the Crown's ability to provide redress to Maori, so the sales could continue.

Te Paparahi o te Raki inquiry
The Tribunal, Te Paparahi o te Raki inquiry (Wai 1040) is in the process of considering the Māori and Crown understandings of He Whakaputanga o te Rangatiratanga / The Declaration of Independence 1835 and Te Tiriti o Waitangi / the Treaty of Waitangi 1840. This aspect of the inquiry raises issues as to the nature of sovereignty and whether the Māori signatories to the Treaty of Waitangi intended to transfer sovereignty.

The first stage of the report was released in November 2014. It found that Ngāpuhi chiefs never agreed to give up their sovereignty when they signed the Treaty of Waitangi in 1840. Tribunal manager Julie Tangaere said at the report's release to the Ngāpuhi claimants:

COVID-19 pandemic
On 19 November 2021, several members of the New Zealand Māori Council including Archdeacon Harvey Ruru and Tā Edward Durie filed an application for an urgent inquiry by the Waitangi Tribunal into Government's response to the COVID-19 pandemic in New Zealand for Māori. The plaintiffs argued that the Government's vaccination rollout policies and plans to ease lockdown restrictions in December 2021 placed Māori at risk.

On 21 December, the Waitangi Tribunal ruled that the Government's vaccination rollout and "traffic light system" breached the Treaty of Waitangi's principles of active protection and equity. The Tribunal criticised the Government's decision to prioritise those aged over 65 years and with health conditions during the vaccine rollout, arguing that they failed to address the youthful nature of the Māori population and its health vulnerabilities. The Tribunal also ruled that the Government's transition to the "traffic light system" failed to take into account the lower Māori vaccination rate and health needs. The Tribunal also found that Government had not adequately consulted with Māori health providers and leaders and determined that efforts to address Māori needs such as the "Māori communities Covid-19 fund" were inadequate. The Waitangi Tribunal recommended that the Government improve data collection, improve engagement with the Māori community, and provided better support for ongoing vaccination efforts, testing, contact tracing, and support for Māori infected with COVID-19. The Tribunal's ruling was welcomed by the Māori Council.

Organisational structure and powers

Investigatory powers
The Waitangi Tribunal is not a court. Since it was established as a permanent commission of inquiry, its method of investigation differs significantly from that of a court in several important respects:

Generally, the Tribunal has authority only to make recommendations. In certain limited situations, the Tribunal does have binding powers, but in most instances, its recommendations do not bind the Crown, the claimants, or any others participating in its inquiries. In contrast, courts can make rulings that bind the parties to whom they relate.
The Tribunal's process is more inquisitorial and less adversarial than that followed in the courts. In particular, it can conduct its own research so as to try to find the truth of a matter, whereas courts generally must decide a matter solely on the evidence and legal arguments presented by the participating parties. Generally, a historian researcher carries out historical research for the tribunal claimants.
The Tribunal's process is flexible; it is not required to follow the rules of evidence that generally apply in the courts, and it may adapt its procedures as it thinks fit. For example, it may not allow cross examination, and hearsay or oral evidence is routinely accepted. For example, the Tribunal may follow 'te kawa o te marae'. In contrast, court procedures are stricter and dependent on evidence. 
The Tribunal does not have final authority to decide points of law. The power rests with the courts. However, the Tribunal has exclusive authority to determine the meaning and effect of the Treaty as it is embodied in both the Māori and English texts.
The Tribunal has a limited power to summon witnesses, require the production of documents, and maintain order at its hearings. It does not have a general power to make orders preventing something from happening or compelling something to happen; nor can it make a party to Tribunal proceedings pay the costs.

Key points
The Tribunal does not settle claims; in fact, it only makes recommendations to the Government. It is not involved in the settlement process, and claimants agree not to pursue matters through the Tribunal while they are engaged in the negotiation process.
Claims are settled by negotiation with the Government. The Office of Treaty Settlements manages the negotiation of Treaty settlements for the Government, and all matters related to negotiations should be addressed to that office.
The Tribunal cannot make recommendations over the return of private land. It may inquire into, and report on, claims relating to land that is privately owned, but unless the land is memorialised, the Tribunal may not recommend that it be returned to Māori ownership or that the Crown acquire it. Memorialised lands are lands owned, or formerly owned, by a State-owned enterprise or a tertiary institution, or former New Zealand Railways lands, that have a memorial (or notation) on their certificate of title advising that the Waitangi Tribunal may recommend that the land be returned to Māori ownership.
The Tribunal can register the claim of any Māori with a grievance against a policy, practice, act, or omission of the Crown. The Tribunal is not required to check that a claimant has a mandate from any group, but it may refuse to inquire into a claim that is considered to be frivolous or vexatious.

The Tribunal process is inquisitorial, not adversarial. It seeks to get to the truth of the matter. The aim is to determine whether a claim is well founded.

Tribunal members

The Tribunal may have a chairperson and up to 20 members at any one time. Members are appointed by the Governor-General on behalf of the Queen on the recommendation of the Minister of Māori Affairs in consultation with the Minister of Justice, for a renewable term of up to three years. For specific inquiries, a panel is composed of three to seven members, at least one of whom must be Māori. The chairperson of the Waitangi Tribunal can also appoint a Māori Land Court judge to act as presiding officer. This panel is then known as the Tribunal for that inquiry, e.g. the Central North Island Tribunal or the Taranaki Tribunal.

As of September 2021, the membership of the Tribunal was:

Chairperson
 Chief Judge Wilson Isaac, Chief Judge Māori Land Court
Deputy Chairperson'''
 Judge Patrick Savage, Māori Land Court
 Other Māori Land Court judges
Ordinary members
 Dr Robyn Anderson, historian
 Ron Crosby, lawyer 
 Derek Fox
 Prof Susy Frankel
 Dr Paul Hamer
 Prof Rawinia Higgins, academic
 Dr Ruakere Hond, academic
Prue Kapua, lawyer
Prof Sir Hirini Moko Mead KNZM, academic
 Basil Morrison CNZM, former Local Politician and President of Local Government New Zealand
Kim Ngarimu, consultant
Dr Hana O'Regan
 Dr Ann Parsonson, historian
 Dr Grant Phillipson, historian
 Kevin Prime
 Dr Thomas Roa, Kaumatua
 Tania Simpson, Policy Advisor
 Prof Linda Tuhiwai Smith CNZM, academic
 Dr Monty Soutar ONZM, historian
Prof Sir Pou Temara KNZM, academic

The Waitangi Tribunal Unit
The Waitangi Tribunal Unit is a special jurisdiction unit of the Ministry of Justice which provides support and services necessary for the Tribunal to do its work. Approximately 60 full-time staff work at the Tribunal, who are divided into the research, corporate and support services, claims and registration, report writing, and editorial teams.

See also
Treaty of Waitangi
Treaty of Waitangi claims and settlements
Office of Treaty Settlements
New Zealand Wars
New Zealand land confiscations
History of New Zealand

References

External links
Waitangi Tribunal (official website)
Treaty of Waitangi Act 1975
The Waitangi Tribunal story on Te Ara
The Treaty of Waitangi Settlement Process story on Te Ara

Government agencies of New Zealand
Treaty of Waitangi
Constitution of New Zealand
Māori politics
Māori organisations
Aboriginal title in New Zealand
1975 establishments in New Zealand